Heather Marie Aldama (born December 1, 1978) is a retired American soccer midfielder who was a member of the United States women's national soccer team.

She played for the Boston Breakers in the Women's United Soccer Association from 2001 to 2003.

International career statistics

References

External links
SoccerTimes player profile

1978 births
Living people
American women's soccer players
Women's association football midfielders
United States women's international soccer players
Santa Clara Broncos women's soccer players
Boston Breakers (WUSA) players
Women's United Soccer Association players